Tarah Kayne (born April 28, 1993) is an American retired competitive pair skater. With former partner Daniel O'Shea, she is the 2018 Four Continents champion, 2014 Four Continents silver medalist, and 2016 U.S. national champion.

Personal life 
Kayne was born on April 28, 1993 in Fort Myers, Florida.

Career

Early years 
Kayne began learning to skate in 1998. She competed in the novice ladies' category in the 2010–2011 season and then on the junior level for one season. She then switched to pairs, teaming up with Daniel O'Shea in April 2012.

2012–2013 season 
Kayne/O'Shea finished seventh in their first trip to the U.S. Championships, in January 2013. Making their international debut, they won the silver medal at the 2013 International Challenge Cup.

2013–2014 season 
Kayne/O'Shea won bronze medals at the U.S. Classic and Ice Challenge. After placing sixth at the 2014 U.S. Championships, they were assigned to the 2014 Four Continents, where they won the silver medal.

2014–2015 season 
On July 28, 2014, Kayne underwent surgery due to a labral tear in her right hip. As a result, the pair withdrew from their 2014–15 Grand Prix assignments, the 2014 Cup of China and 2014 Rostelecom Cup. Kayne/O'Shea returned to competition at the 2014 Golden Spin of Zagreb, taking bronze at the ISU Challenger Series (CS) event. The pair stepped onto their first national podium at the 2015 U.S. Championships, where they were awarded the bronze medal.

2015–2016 season 
Kayne/O'Shea began their season with gold at a CS event, the 2015 U.S. International Classic. Kayne injured her right knee at the event.

Making their Grand Prix debut, the pair placed sixth at the 2015 Skate America and fourth at the 2015 Rostelecom Cup. Another Challenger medal followed, bronze at the 2015 Golden Spin of Zagreb in December. In January, Kayne/O'Shea placed first in both segments at the 2016 U.S. Championships and won the gold medal by a margin of 14.85 points over defending champions Alexa Scimeca / Chris Knierim.

2016–2017 season 
After placing fifth at the 2016 CS Finlandia Trophy, Kayne/O'Shea competed at two Grand Prix events, finishing sixth at the 2016 Skate America and fourth at the 2016 NHK Trophy. The pair withdrew from the 2017 U.S. Championships due to a concussion, Kayne having hit her head while attempting a throw triple flip during the short program on January 19.

During the season, Kayne experienced increasing pain due to right knee tendinitis, the result of her 2015 injury. She received a new cadaver tendon in an operation at the Vail Valley Medical Center on February 14, 2017 and then refrained from walking for seven weeks. She resumed training by July 2017.

2017–2018 season 
Kayne/O'Shea did not compete in the early part of the season, including the Grand Prix, instead beginning the season at the 2017 CS Golden Spin of Zagreb, where they won the bronze medal.  They took silver at the 2018 U.S. Championships, and were named first alternates for the 2018 Winter Olympics, where the United States had only one pairs spot, as well as part of America's teams for the Four Continents and World Championships.

At the 2018 Four Continents Championships, they were third after the short program and then had a personal best score in the free skate to win the gold medal, the first American team to do so in over a decade.  Kayne said she felt "really great about our performance,"  They anticipated competing at the World Championships.  However, following the event, Kayne was diagnosed with a stress fracture in her right knee. As a result, they withdrew from the World Championships, and were replaced by bronze medalists Deanna Stellato / Nathan Bartholomay.

They were coached by Jim Peterson, in Ellenton, Florida, until the end of the season.

2018–2019 season 

On September 7, 2018, Kayne/O'Shea announced a coaching change, deciding to join Dalilah Sappenfield in Colorado Springs, Colorado.  They began the season with the seventh-place finish at the 2018 CS Nebelhorn Trophy.  Assigned to two Grand Prix events, they first competed at the 2018 NHK Trophy, finishing fifth.  At the 2018 Internationaux de France, Kayne/O'Shea were fourth after the short program, but placed second in the free skate, finishing less than two points ahead of bronze medalists Aleksandra Boikova / Dmitrii Kozlovskii.  This was their first Grand Prix medal.  Kayne remarked that after a "less than desirable" performance in Japan, "to have come to France and make this much improvement in just two short weeks made us both very happy."

At the 2019 U.S. Championships, Kayne/O'Shea placed first in the short program, just ahead of Ashley Cain / Timothy LeDuc.  In the free skate, they made some small opening mistakes on their twist and side-by-side jumps, but then had a major error when they failed to execute their final lift, which caused them to drop to fourth place.  O'Shea commented afterward "I didn’t do what I was supposed to do."  They were nevertheless named to the American team for the Four Continents Championships over bronze medalists Stellato-Dudek/Bartholomay.  They finished in sixth place there, with Kayne saying their performance was a personal disappointment.

2019–2020 season 
Kayne/O'Shea began with a fourth-place finish at the 2019 CS U.S. Classic.  On the Grand Prix, they were sixth to begin at the 2019 Cup of China.  Kayne/O'Shea were sixth as well at the 2019 NHK Trophy.

Competing at the 2020 U.S. Championships, Kayne/O'Shea placed second in the short program, seven points behind the leaders, Knierim/Knierim.  Third in the free skate, they won the bronze medal behind the Knierims and Calalang/Johnson.  O'Shea called it "an improvement as the program has progressed over the first part of the season. We are taking steps in the right direction."  They finished the season with a fifth-place finish at the 2020 Four Continents Championships.

2020–2021 season 

In September, Kayne and O'Shea announced they were leaving coach Dalilah Sappenfield, at the time saying publicly that they were looking forward to exploring new training options and looking forward to staying strong as a team.

They were fourth at the ISP Points Challenge, a virtual domestic competition. They competed at the 2020 Skate America, primarily attended by American pairs teams due to travel restrictions relating to the COVID-19 pandemic. Their previous coaches Jim Peterson and Amanda Evora helped them to prepare for the competition. The permanent training environment of Kayne and O'Shea will be determined after the competition.

On December 10, it was announced that Kayne and O'Shea had split. While Kayne initially said she would be staying with Peterson and Evora as coaches, she subsequently retired from competitive skating.

Allegations against Dalilah Sappenfield 
In an exposé written by Christine Brennan and published by USA Today on October 8, 2021, Kayne detailed the alleged emotional and psychological abuse she endured at the hands of her former coach, Dalilah Sappenfield, before leaving her training group in September 2020. Kayne stated that Sappenfield's abuse prompted her to engage in self-harm behaviors, and that she'd been afraid to seek mental health treatment out of concern that Sappenfield would find out. She said to Brennan, "these awful experiences forced me out of the sport I love. Dalilah said multiple times that she wanted to end my career, and she succeeded." Kayne's former skating partner, Danny O'Shea, expressed his support for Kayne on social media. Kayne was one of several skaters to file complaints against Sappenfield with the United States Center for SafeSport, leading to her suspension pending further investigation.

Programs 
(with O'Shea)

(Single Skating)

Competitive highlights 
GP: Grand Prix; CS: Challenger Series

With O'Shea

Single skating

References

External links 
  at Figure Skaters Online
 

1993 births
Living people
American female pair skaters
Four Continents Figure Skating Championships medalists
Sportspeople from Fort Myers, Florida
21st-century American women
20th-century American women